For the Expose song, see I'll Never Get Over You Getting Over Me.

"I'll Never Get Over You" is a song and single by British band, Johnny Kidd & the Pirates. Written by Gordon Mills it was first released in the UK in 1963.

Background and chart success
The single reached number 4 in the UK charts in 1963 and was in the charts for 15 weeks. It was Johnny Kidd & the Pirates' sixth UK chart success and the band's second highest placed single in the chart. The song was influenced by the Merseybeat sound, its intro recalling the outro of the Beatles' "Please Please Me".

References 

1963 songs
1963 singles
Songs written by Gordon Mills
His Master's Voice singles